is a Japanese former competitive figure skater. She is the 2005 ISU Junior Grand Prix Final silver medalist and 2005 JGP Japan champion.

Career 
Sawada began skating when she was six at her mother's encouragement. She debuted on the ISU Junior Grand Prix series in the 2002–03 season. In 2003–04, she won bronze medals at the ISU Junior Grand Prix in Japan and at the Japan Junior Championships. She was then assigned to the 2004 World Junior Championships, where she placed fifth.

During the 2004–05 JGP series, Sawada won silver in Hungary and bronze in Ukraine and qualified for the JGP Final, where she finished seventh. After repeating as the Japanese junior bronze medalist, she finished ninth at the 2005 World Junior Championships.

In 2005–06, Sawada won two JGP medals — silver in Slovakia and gold in Japan — and qualified for her second JGP Final, where she took the silver medal. After winning the Japanese junior title, she was sent to her third World Junior Championships and placed fifth.

Sawada made her senior international debut in the 2006–07 season. She competed at two Grand Prix events, the 2006 Cup of China and 2006 Cup of Russia, and at the 2007 Four Continents Championships, where she placed fourth.

Sawada landed triple Axels in national competition.

Programs

Competition highlights 
GP: Grand Prix; JGP: Junior Grand Prix

References

External links 
 

1988 births
Living people
Japanese female single skaters
Sportspeople from Osaka
Kansai University alumni
Figure skaters at the 2007 Asian Winter Games